The 2020–21 Florida Gulf Coast Eagles men's basketball team represented Florida Gulf Coast University in the 2020–21 NCAA Division I men's basketball season. The Eagles, led by third-year head coach Michael Fly, played their home games at Alico Arena in Fort Myers, Florida as members of the Atlantic Sun Conference. They finished the season 10-8, 4-5 in ASUN Play to finish  in 6th place. They defeated Lipscomb in the quarterfinals of the ASUN tournament before losing in the semifinals to North Alabama.

Previous season 
The Eagles finished the 2019–20 season 10–22, 7–9 in ASUN Play to finish in a tie for sixth place. They lost in the quarterfinals of the ASUN tournament to Lipscomb.

Roster

Schedule and results 

|-
!colspan=9 style=| Non-conference regular season

|-
!colspan=9 style=| Atlantic Sun Conference regular season

|-
!colspan=12 style=| Atlantic Sun tournament

Source

References

Florida Gulf Coast Eagles men's basketball seasons
Florida Gulf Coast
Florida Gulf Coast
Florida Gulf Coast